Naigaon Assembly constituency is one of the 288 Vidhan Sabha (legislative assembly) constituencies of Maharashtra state, western India. This constituency is located in Nanded district. The delimitation of the constituency happened in 2008.

Geographical scope
The constituency comprises Umri taluka, Dharmabad taluka and Naigaon taluka.

Representatives

 1962-2008: Does not existed
 2009: Vasantrao Balwantrao Chavan Independent
 2014: Vasantrao Balwantrao Chavan INC
 2019: Rajesh Sambhaji Pawar BJP

References

Assembly constituencies of Maharashtra
Politics of Nanded district